Panagiotis "Pete" Sykaras (born 5 May 1979 in Niles, Illinois) is a Greek baseball player who competed in the 2004 Summer Olympics.

References

1979 births
Living people
Sportspeople from Cook County, Illinois
Greek baseball players
Olympic baseball players of Greece
Baseball players at the 2004 Summer Olympics
American people of Greek descent
Baseball players from Illinois
Panathinaikos Baseball players
People from Niles, Illinois